Statistics of Czechoslovak First League in the 1975–76 season.

Overview
It was contested by 16 teams, and FC Baník Ostrava won the championship. Dušan Galis was the league's top scorer with 21 goals.

Stadia and locations

League standings

Sparta Prague qualified for the Cup Winners' Cup as Czechoslovak Cup winners from a lower division.

Results

Squad of the champions Baník Ostrava 
Coach: Jiří Rubáš
 Milan Albrecht
 Josef Foks
 Jiří Hudeček
 František Huml
 Jiří Klement
 Lubomír Knapp
 Josef Kolečko
 Arnošt Kvasnica
 Verner Lička
 Zdeněk Lorenc
 Pavol Michalík
 Miroslav Mička
 Lumír Mochel
 Libor Radimec
 Jiří Ruš
 Zdeněk Rygel
 František Schmucker
 Rostislav Sionko
 Vladimír Šišma
 Petr Slaný
 Miroslav Smetana
 Zdeněk Svatonský
 Josef Tondra
 Rostislav Vojáček
 Miroslav Vojkůvka
 Ladislav Zetocha

Top goalscorers

References

 Czechoslovakia - List of final tables (RSSSF)

Czechoslovak First League seasons
Czech
1975–76 in Czechoslovak football